Donald J. Weidner is Dean Emeritus and Alumni Centennial Professor at Florida State University College of Law. He served as dean from 1991 to 2016 and was one of the longest sitting law school deans in the U.S. He received his J.D. from the University of Texas School of Law. Dean Weidner is a leading scholar on partnerships, limited liability companies and fiduciary duties.  In 2011, he was named one of nine Transformative Law Deans of the Last Decade by The Leiter Report.

He has served as a visiting professor at the law schools of the University of Texas, University of New Mexico, Stanford University and the University of North Carolina, and worked at the New York firm of Willkie Farr & Gallagher. He is co-author of The Revised Uniform Partnership Act (West Group, 2019), a member of the American Law Institute, and served as the Reporter for the Revised Uniform Partnership Act. He was appointed to the Uniform Law Commission by Florida Governor Rick Scott in 2011 and reappointed in 2015. He also serves as a mediator and arbitrator with Upchurch Watson White & Max and is an arbitrator with the American Arbitration Association.

References

External links
 Florida State University College of Law faculty profile

American legal scholars
Florida State University faculty
University of Texas School of Law alumni
Living people
Year of birth missing (living people)
People associated with Willkie Farr & Gallagher